Alicia Walsh (14 February 1911 in Hunters Hill, New South Wales – 4 May 1984 in Mosman, New South Wales) was an Australian cricket player. Walsh played three test matches for the Australia national women's cricket team.

References

1911 births
1984 deaths
Australia women Test cricketers